A cash seal ("Baochao" means "valuable money", "Yin" means "seal") is a type of seal used as an anti-counterfeiting measure on paper money or banknotes. The cash seal first appeared during the Song dynasty in China.

The short name is Chao Yin, and the full name is Seal of Baochao, or Baochao Yinjian. The name can also be simply translated as "money seal" or "banknote seal".

History

The economy of China during the Song dynasty outpaced the supply of traditional coinage, leading the government to issue banknotes (Jiaozi (交子)) to increase the money supply. Subsequently, a government department was created to manage cash affairs, with its responsibilities including producing and issuing cash, and combating counterfeiting. The cash seal was developed as an anti-counterfeiting measure; official banknotes received a red, sometimes black or purple, stamp at their centres. This forced counterfeiters to attempt to replicate the seal, presumably leading to distinguishable lower quality stamps. Severe punishments, including the death penalty, were given to counterfeiters.

The Ming and Qing dynasties also stamped banknotes. The Ming government department responsible for cash affairs and the use of the cash seal was the Baochao Bureau.

Modern time
The use of cash seals is no longer restricted to governments. Seals or private individuals and organizations may be used in the same manner on private banknotes to represent the parties' trust, credit, or authority.

In the era of the Republic of China, these seal stamps could also be called Yinhang Yin (銀行印/银行印; direct translation: the seal stamp of bank, or just "bank seal").

In Japan, ginkō-in (Japanese: 銀行印) seals have similar functions.

In Singapore, a seal has been present in all Singapore dollar banknotes since its first series, bearing the chairman of the Monetary Authority of Singapore (MAS) or the Board of Commissioners of Currency Singapore (BCCS).

Typical seals
In late imperial China:
 大明寳鈔之印 / 大明宝钞之印 (traditional/simplified Chinese); The Seal of Cash of the Great Ming.
 大清寳鈔之印 / 大清宝钞之印; The Seal of Cash of the Great Qing.

See also

 Seal (East Asia)
 Banknote
 Cash
 Economy of the Song Dynasty

References

External links 
 The anti-counterfeiting techniques of Ming Dynasty cash 

  

Banknotes of China
Chinese inventions
Economic history of China
Seals (insignia)